In mathematics, the  Fubini–Study metric is a Kähler metric on projective Hilbert space, that is, on a complex projective space CPn endowed with a Hermitian form. This metric was originally described in 1904 and 1905 by Guido Fubini and Eduard Study.

A Hermitian form in (the vector space) Cn+1 defines a unitary subgroup U(n+1) in GL(n+1,C). A Fubini–Study metric is determined up to homothety (overall scaling) by invariance under such a U(n+1) action; thus it is homogeneous. Equipped with a Fubini–Study metric, CPn is a symmetric space. The particular normalization on the metric depends on the application.  In Riemannian geometry, one uses a normalization so that the Fubini–Study metric simply relates to the standard metric on the (2n+1)-sphere.  In algebraic geometry, one uses a normalization making CPn a Hodge manifold.

Construction
The Fubini–Study metric arises naturally in the quotient space construction of complex projective space.

Specifically, one may define CPn to be the space consisting of all complex lines in Cn+1, i.e., the quotient of Cn+1\{0} by the equivalence relation relating all complex multiples of each point together. This agrees with the quotient by the diagonal group action of the multiplicative group C* = C \ {0}:

This quotient realizes Cn+1\{0} as a complex line bundle over the base space CPn. (In fact this is the so-called tautological bundle over CPn.)  A point of CPn is thus identified with an equivalence class of (n+1)-tuples [Z0,...,Zn] modulo nonzero complex rescaling; the Zi are called homogeneous coordinates of the point.

Furthermore, one may realize this quotient mapping in two steps: since multiplication by a nonzero complex scalar z = R eiθ can be uniquely thought of as the composition of a dilation by the modulus R followed by a counterclockwise rotation about the origin by an angle , the quotient mapping Cn+1 → CPn splits into two pieces.

where step (a) is a quotient by the dilation Z ~ RZ for R ∈ R+, the multiplicative group of positive real numbers, and step (b) is a quotient by the rotations Z ~ eiθZ.

The result of the quotient in (a) is the real hypersphere S2n+1 defined by the equation |Z|2 = |Z0|2 + ... + |Zn|2 = 1. The quotient in (b) realizes CPn = S2n+1/S1, where S1 represents the group of rotations.

As a metric quotient

When a quotient is taken of a Riemannian manifold (or metric space in general), care must be taken to ensure that the quotient space is endowed with a metric that is well-defined. For instance, if a group G acts on a Riemannian manifold (X,g), then in order for the orbit space X/G to possess an induced metric,  must be constant along G-orbits in the sense that for any element h ∈ G and pair of vector fields  we must have g(Xh,Yh) = g(X,Y).

The standard Hermitian metric on Cn+1 is given in the standard basis by

whose realification is the standard Euclidean metric on R2n+2. This metric is not invariant under the diagonal action of C*, so we are unable to directly push it down to CPn in the quotient. However, this metric is invariant under the diagonal action of S1 = U(1), the group of rotations. Therefore, step (b) in the above construction is possible once step (a) is accomplished.

The Fubini–Study metric is the metric induced on the quotient CPn = S2n+1/S1, where  carries the so-called "round metric" endowed upon it by restriction of the standard Euclidean metric to the unit hypersphere.

In local affine coordinates
Corresponding to a point in CPn with homogeneous coordinates [Z0:...:Zn], there is a unique set of n coordinates (z1,...,zn) such that

provided Z0 ≠ 0; specifically, zj = Zj/Z0.  The (z1,...,zn) form an affine coordinate system for CPn in the coordinate patch U0 = {Z0 ≠ 0}.  One can develop an affine coordinate system in any of the coordinate patches Ui = {Zi ≠ 0} by dividing instead by Zi in the obvious manner.  The n+1 coordinate patches Ui cover CPn, and it is possible to give the metric explicitly in terms of the affine coordinates (z1,...,zn) on Ui.  The coordinate derivatives define a frame  of the holomorphic tangent bundle of CPn, in terms of which the Fubini–Study metric has Hermitian components

where |z|2 = |z1|2+...+|zn|2.  That is, the Hermitian matrix of the Fubini–Study metric in this frame is

Note that each matrix element is unitary-invariant: the diagonal action  will leave this matrix unchanged.

Accordingly, the line element is given by

In this last expression, the summation convention is used to sum over Latin indices i,j that range from 1 to n.

The metric can be derived from the following Kähler potential:

as

Using homogeneous coordinates
An expression is also possible in the notation of homogeneous coordinates, commonly used to describe projective varieties of algebraic geometry: Z = [Z0:...:Zn].  Formally, subject to suitably interpreting the expressions involved, one has

Here the summation convention is used to sum over Greek indices α β ranging from 0 to n, and in the last equality the standard notation for the skew part of a tensor is used:

Now, this expression for ds2 apparently defines a tensor on the total space of the tautological bundle Cn+1\{0}.  It is to be understood properly as a tensor on CPn by pulling it back along a holomorphic section σ of the tautological bundle of CPn.  It remains then to verify that the value of the pullback is independent of the choice of section: this can be done by a direct calculation.

The Kähler form of this metric is

The pullback of this is clearly independent of the choice of holomorphic section.  The quantity log|Z|2 is the Kähler potential (sometimes called the Kähler scalar) of CPn.

In bra-ket coordinate notation
In quantum mechanics, the Fubini–Study metric is also known as the Bures metric. However, the Bures metric is typically defined in the notation of mixed states, whereas the exposition below is written in terms of a pure state.  The real part of the metric is (four times) the Fisher information metric.

The Fubini–Study metric may be written using the bra–ket notation commonly used in quantum mechanics. To explicitly equate this notation to the homogeneous coordinates given above, let

or, equivalently, in projective variety notation,

In Hilbert space, the metric can be rather trivially interpreted as the angle between two vectors; thus it is occasionally called the quantum angle.

The infinitesimal form of this metric may be quickly obtained by taking  , or equivalently,  to obtain

In the context of quantum mechanics, CP1 is called the Bloch sphere; the Fubini–Study metric is the natural metric for the geometrization of quantum mechanics. Much of the peculiar behaviour of quantum mechanics, including quantum entanglement and the Berry phase effect, can be attributed to the peculiarities of the Fubini–Study metric.

The n = 1 case 
When n = 1, there is a diffeomorphism  given by stereographic projection. This leads to the "special" Hopf fibration S1 → S3 → S2.  When the Fubini–Study metric is written in coordinates on CP1, its restriction to the real tangent bundle yields an expression of the ordinary "round metric" of radius 1/2 (and Gaussian curvature 4) on S2.

Namely, if z = x + iy is the standard affine coordinate chart on the Riemann sphere CP1 and x = r cos θ, y = r sin θ are polar coordinates on C, then a routine computation shows

where  is the round metric on the unit 2-sphere. Here φ, θ are "mathematician's spherical coordinates" on S2 coming from the stereographic projection r tan(φ/2) = 1, tan θ = y/x. (Many physics references interchange the roles of φ and θ.)

The Kähler form is

Applying the Hodge star to the Kähler form, one obtains

implying that K is harmonic.

The n = 2 case 
The Fubini–Study metric on the complex projective plane CP2 has been proposed as a gravitational instanton, the gravitational analog of an instanton. The metric, the connection form and the curvature are readily computed, once suitable real 4D coordinates are established. Writing  for real Cartesian coordinates, one then defines polar coordinate one-forms on the 4-sphere (the quaternionic projective line) as

The  are the standard left-invariant one-form coordinate frame on the Lie group ; that is, they obey  for  cyclic.

The line element, starting with the previously given expression, is given by

The vierbeins can be immediately read off from the last expression:

That is, in the vierbein coordinate system, using roman-letter subscripts, the metric tensor is Euclidean:

Given the vierbein, a spin connection can be computed; the Levi-Civita spin connection is the unique connection that is torsion-free and covariantly constant, namely, it is the one-form  that satisfies the torsion-free condition

and is covariantly constant, which, for spin connections, means that it is antisymmetric in the vierbein indexes:

The above is readily solved; one obtains

The curvature 2-form is defined as

and is constant:

The Ricci tensor in veirbein indexes is given by

where the curvature 2-form was expanded as a four-component tensor:

The resulting Ricci tensor is constant

so that the resulting Einstein equation 

can be solved with the cosmological constant .

The Weyl tensor for Fubini–Study metrics in general is given by

For the n = 2 case, the two-forms

are self-dual:

Curvature properties
In the n = 1 special case, the Fubini–Study metric has constant sectional curvature identically equal to 4, according to the equivalence with the 2-sphere's round metric (which given a radius R has sectional curvature ).  However, for n > 1, the Fubini–Study metric does not have constant curvature. Its sectional curvature is instead given by the equation

A consequence of this formula is that the sectional curvature satisfies  for all 2-planes . The maximum sectional curvature (4) is attained at a holomorphic 2-plane — one for which J(σ) ⊂ σ — while the minimum sectional curvature (1) is attained at a 2-plane for which J(σ) is orthogonal to σ. For this reason, the Fubini–Study metric is often said to have "constant holomorphic sectional curvature" equal to 4.

This makes CPn a (non-strict) quarter pinched manifold; a celebrated theorem shows that a strictly quarter-pinched simply connected n-manifold must be homeomorphic to a sphere.

The Fubini–Study metric is also an Einstein metric in that it is proportional to its own Ricci tensor: there exists a constant ; such that for all i,j we have

This implies, among other things, that the Fubini–Study metric remains unchanged up to a scalar multiple under the Ricci flow. It also makes CPn indispensable to the theory of general relativity, where it serves as a nontrivial solution to the vacuum Einstein field equations.

The cosmological constant  for CPn is given in terms of the dimension of the space:

Product metric
The common notions of separability apply for the Fubini–Study metric. More precisely, the metric is separable on the natural product of projective spaces, the Segre embedding.

Connection and curvature
The fact that the metric can be derived from the Kähler potential means that the Christoffel symbols and the curvature tensors contain a lot of symmetries, and can be given a particularly simple form: The Christoffel symbols, in the local affine coordinates, are given by

The Riemann tensor is also particularly simple:

The Ricci tensor is

Pronunciation

A common pronunciation mistake, made especially by native English speakers, is to assume that Study is pronounced the same as the verb to study. Since it is actually a German name, the correct way to pronounce the u in Study is the same as the u in Fubini. Furthermore, the S in Study is pronounced like the sh in Fisher. In terms of phonetics: ʃtuːdi.

See also
 Non-linear sigma model
 Kaluza–Klein theory
 Arakelov height

References

 
 
 .

Projective geometry
Complex manifolds
Symplectic geometry
Structures on manifolds
Quantum mechanics